Cirrhinus mrigala is a species of ray-finned fish in the genus Cirrhinus. It is found in northern India, Pakistan, Bangladesh and Nepal. This species and the Mrigal carp (Cirrhinus cirrhosus) are both considered distinct.

References

Cirrhinus
Fish described in 1822